The men's 1 kilometre sprint classic competition of the 2014 Winter Paralympics was held at Laura Biathlon & Ski Complex near Krasnaya Polyana, Sochi. The competition took place on 12 March 2014

Medal table

Visually Impaired
In the cross-country skiing 1 km Sprint visually impaired, the athlete with a visual impairment has a sighted guide. The two skiers are considered a team, and dual medals are awarded.

Qualification

Finals

Semifinal 1

Semifinal 2

Final

Sitting

Qualification

Finals

Semifinal 1

Semifinal 2

Final

Standing

Qualification

Finals

Semifinal 1

Semifinal 2

Final

See also
Cross-country skiing at the 2014 Winter Olympics

References

Men's 1km Sprint Classic